Martine Patenaude (born September 28, 1974) is a Canadian former ice dancer. With partner Eric Massé, she won the bronze medal at the Canadian Figure Skating Championships in 1994. After retiring from skating for a decade, she returned to the ice with Pascal Denis. They won the silver medal at the 2004 Nebelhorn Trophy.

Programs 
(with Denis)

Results 
GP: Grand Prix

With Denis

With Massé

References

External links
 

1974 births
Canadian female ice dancers
Living people
Figure skaters from Montreal